Sailer is a surname. Notable people with the surname include:

Chris Sailer (born 1977), American football player and trainer
Friederike Sailer (1920–1994), German soprano
Johann Michael Sailer (1751–1832), German Jesuit professor of theology and Bishop of Ratisbon
Sebastian Sailer (1714–1777), German Premonstratensian Baroque preacher and writer
Steve Sailer (born 1958), American journalist and film critic
Toni Sailer (1935–2009), Austrian skier
Verena Sailer (born 1985), German athlete

See also
Sailer (disambiguation)
Saylor